Ruslan Lyubarskyi (born 29 September 1973 in Bar, Ukraine) is a former professional Ukrainian-Slovak football midfielder. Lyubarskyi is mostly known for his time playing in Košice in the Corgoň Liga and Maccabi Netanya in the Israeli Premier League.

Career
Lyubarski spent six seasons in Slovakia, where he led 1. FC Košice to two championships. He had a brief spell with Sparta Prague. He also played for Maccabi Netanya in Israel for four seasons, also playing with the club in the Intertoto Cup. Lyubarskyi came to Metalurh in 2004, and debuted in a match against Tavriya Simferopol.
In 2008 he came back to play in Slovakia as he signed for Humenné.

In 17 July 2015, Lyubarski moved to TJ Družstevník Radvaň nad Laborcom, a small amateur club that plays in 4. Liga.

Honours
Corgoň Liga (2):
1997, 1998
Slovak Cup (1):
1996
3. Liga (1):
2011–12

References

External links 
Profile on Official Metalurh Website

1973 births
People from Bar, Ukraine
Living people
Ukrainian footballers
Association football forwards
AC Sparta Prague players
FC VSS Košice players
ŠK Futura Humenné players
Maccabi Netanya F.C. players
FC Metalurh Zaporizhzhia players
MFK Zemplín Michalovce players
Slovak Super Liga players
2. Liga (Slovakia) players
3. Liga (Slovakia) players
4. Liga (Slovakia) players
5. Liga players
Israeli Premier League players
Expatriate footballers in the Czech Republic
Ukrainian expatriate sportspeople in the Czech Republic
Expatriate footballers in Israel
Ukrainian expatriate sportspeople in Israel
Expatriate footballers in Slovakia
Ukrainian expatriate sportspeople in Slovakia
Sportspeople from Vinnytsia Oblast